The 1994–95 Drexel Dragons men's basketball team represented Drexel University  during the 1994–95 NCAA Division I men's basketball season. The Dragons, led by 4th year head coach Bill Herrion, played their home games at the Daskalakis Athletic Center and were members of the North Atlantic Conference (NAC).

The team finished the season 22–8, and finished in 1st place in the NAC in the regular season.

Roster

Schedule

|-
!colspan=9 style="background:#F8B800; color:#002663;"| Regular season
|-

|-
!colspan=9 style="background:#F5CF47; color:#002663;"| NAC tournament

|-
!colspan=9 style="background:#F8B800; color:#002663;"| 1995 NCAA Division I men's basketball tournament
|-

Awards
 Bill Herrion
NAC Coach of the Year

Brian Holden
NAC All-Conference First Team
NAC All-Tournament Team
NAC Player of the Week (2)

Leland Redmond
NAC All-Rookie Team

Malik Rose
NAC Player of the Year
NAC All-Conference First Team
NAC Tournament Most Valuable Player
NAC All-Tournament Team
NAC Player of the Week

References

Drexel Dragons men's basketball seasons
Drexel
Drexel
1994 in sports in Pennsylvania
1995 in sports in Pennsylvania